Frank Smith was a professional rugby league footballer who played in the 1930s and 1940s.

Playing career

County honours
Frank Smith won a cap for Yorkshire while at Castleford playing left-, i.e. number 11, in the 26-17 victory over Villeneuve at Lawkholme Lane, Keighley on 15 September 1934.

County League appearances
Frank Smith played in Castleford's victories in the Yorkshire County League during the 1932–33 season and 1938–39 season.

Challenge Cup Final appearances
Frank Smith played left-, i.e. number 11, in Castleford's 11-8 victory over Huddersfield in the 1935 Challenge Cup Final during the 1934–35 season at Wembley Stadium, London on Saturday 4 May 1935, in front of a crowd of 39,000.

Club career
Bradford Northern beat Dewsbury in the Championship play-off semi-final during the 1942–43 season. However, Dewsbury's manager, Eddie Waring, appealed to the Rugby Football League, claiming that Bradford Northern had fielded Wakefield Trinity's Sandy Orford as a guest player, and that Orford was ineligible because prior to the semi-final, he had played only three league matches for Bradford Northern, rather than the regulatory minimum of four league matches, the semi-final actually being Orford's fourth league match. Bradford Northern was disqualified, and Dewsbury went on to a 33-16 aggregate victory over Halifax in the Championship Final. However, a month later, Bradford appealed to the Rugby Football League, claiming that Dewsbury had fielded Castleford's Frank Smith as a guest player, and that Smith was ineligible because prior to the semi-final, he had played only three league matches for Dewsbury, rather than the regulatory minimum of four league matches, though he had played in a number of cup matches. Bradford Northern's appeal was upheld and the Rugby Football League Council fined Dewsbury £100 (based on increases in average earnings, this would be approximately £11,780 in 2013), stripped them of the Championship title, and declared the Championship during the 1942–43 season void.

Genealogical information
Frank Smith was the father of the rugby league footballer; Frank Smith Jr.

References

External links
Search for "Smith" at rugbyleagueproject.org
Frank Smith Memory Box Search at archive.castigersheritage.com
Search for "Frank Smith" at britishnewspaperarchive.co.uk

Castleford Tigers players
Dewsbury Rams players
English rugby league players
Place of birth missing
Place of death missing
Rugby league second-rows
Year of birth missing
Year of death missing
Yorkshire rugby league team players